Mavrick Pierre Annerose (born 29 November 1995) is a Guadeloupean professional footballer who plays as a winger for the club USR, and the Guadeloupe national team.

International career
Annette debuted with the Guadeloupe national team in a 1–1 friendly Martinique on 6 February 2016. He was called up to represent Guadeloupe at the 2021 CONCACAF Gold Cup.

References

External links
 
 

1995 births
Living people
People from Pointe-à-Pitre
Guadeloupean footballers
Guadeloupe international footballers
Association football wingers
2021 CONCACAF Gold Cup players